The 2022 Ahlsell Nordic Golf Tour was the 37th season of the Swedish Golf Tour, a series of professional golf tournaments for women held in Sweden and neighboring countries.

Tournaments also featured on the 2022 LET Access Series (LETAS).

Schedule
The season consisted of 6 tournaments played between May and September, where one event was held in Denmark.

Ranking
164 players from 28 countries appeared in the final Order of Merit. In addition to 19 European countries, players from New Zealand, Australia, Malaysia, Japan, South Korea, India, South Africa, Morocco and the United States participated. 

Patricia Isabel Schmidt of Germany won the Order of Merit following victory at the Big Green Egg Swedish Matchplay Championship and two further top-10 finishes.

Source:

See also
2022 Ladies European Tour

References

External links
Official homepage of the Ahlsell Nordic Golf Tour

Swedish Golf Tour (women)
Swedish Golf Tour (women)